General Urquiza is a station on Line E of the Buenos Aires Underground. The station was opened on 20 June 1944 as the eastern terminus of the inaugural section of the line from San José to General Urquiza. On 16 December 1944 the line was extended to Boedo.

References

External links

Buenos Aires Underground stations